Alex Carapetis (born 27 April 1982) is an Australian drummer and member of The Voidz. He was formerly a member of Wolfmother, and has toured with Nine Inch Nails, and Julian Casablancas among others.  Alex currently resides in Los Angeles.

Early life

Born in Adelaide, Australia, Alex studied jazz at the Elder Conservatorium in 2000 before moving to Sydney to further his music career.  He finally relocated to the US in 2005 at the age of 23.

Career

Touring
In October 2005, Trent Reznor hired Carapetis to be the touring drummer for Nine Inch Nails on their With Teeth World Tour alongside openers Queens of the Stone Age and Autolux.  In 2006, Alex toured as a drummer with Phoenix on their 'It's Never Been Like That' tour through the US and Europe and finished the year touring with Juliette and the Licks.

Studio Work
Alex has worked on various studio recordings with notable artists such as Sky Ferreira, Noah and the Whale, Passion Pit, Robbie Williams and Lenny Kravitz.

Julian Casablancas+The Voidz
After touring extensively with Julian Casablancas in 2009, Alex once again joined forces with The Strokes frontman on his new project, Julian Casablancas+The Voidz.  The band, also composed of Jeramy "Beardo" Gritter (guitar), Amir Yaghmai (guitar), Jacob "Jake" Bercovici (bass guitar, synthesizers) and Jeff Kite (keys), began recording in 2013 in New York City in a DIY studio above Strand Book Store.  They completed their first record, Tyranny, in 2014 and released it worldwide on September 23, 2014 to favorable reviews and press, including a covers of NME Magazine, Plugged and Alt-Citizen and TV appearances on Late Night with Jimmy Fallon and Le Grand Journal.  Carapetis is credited as a songwriter on 'Human Sadness,' the second single off of Tyranny.  The band toured extensively throughout late 2014, including stops in the US, South America and Europe. In 2015, the band continued to work on new music and tour, with appearances in Barcelona and Paris, among others.

Solo

In 2015, Alex began further work on an as-yet-to-be-titled solo project, performing under the name Young Pirate. He is currently working on his first solo EP which will feature original compositions and key guest vocalists and rappers.

Endorsements
Carapetis is currently endorsed by US brands SUPRA shoes, KR3W Denim and Wildfox.  He has previously worked with Vans and Diesel.

References

External links
 Julian Casablancas+The Voidz Official Website

Australian drummers
Male drummers
Australian emigrants to the United States
Nine Inch Nails members
Living people
1982 births
The Dead Daisies members
Musicians from Adelaide
Australian people of Greek Cypriot descent
21st-century drummers
Wolfmother members
People educated at Immanuel College, Adelaide